No Sail is a cartoon produced by Walt Disney Productions in 1945, featuring Donald Duck and Goofy. It follows Donald and Goofy after finding themselves stranded at sea and the crazy ways they try to survive.

Plot
Goofy and Donald buy a coin-operated sailboat, which leaves Donald constantly depositing nickels into the slot to keep the sail functioning. Donald loses his temper and breaks the mechanism, stranding him and Goofy in the open ocean. After several days, they try to catch some fish to eat, but are beaten by a seagull. Donald realizes that sharks are beginning to circle, but Goofy remains happily oblivious. When the sharks leave, Donald accidentally falls bill-first into the coin slot, which sends the mast shooting out and folding into place.

Voice cast
 Donald Duck: Clarence Nash
 Goofy: Pinto Colvig

Home media
The short was released on December 6, 2005 on Walt Disney Treasures: The Chronological Donald, Volume Two: 1942-1946.

Additional release include:
Walt Disney's Classic Cartoon Favorites Extreme Adventure Fun" Volume 7.

References

External links
 

1940s Disney animated short films
Donald Duck short films
Goofy (Disney) short films
Films directed by Jack Hannah
Films produced by Walt Disney
Films scored by Oliver Wallace
1945 animated films
1945 short films
Sailing films
1940s English-language films
American animated short films
RKO Pictures short films
RKO Pictures animated short films
Animated films about dogs
Films about ducks